José Luis Valdez (born 14 April 1998) is an Argentine former footballer.

Club career
Valdez made his senior debut in a 0–3 loss to Newell's Old Boys on August 28, 2016, replacing Enzo Acosta for the final 15 minutes. Shortly after, he signed his first professional contract with the Greater Buenos Aires-based club.

Career statistics

Club

Notes

References

1998 births
Living people
Argentine footballers
Argentina youth international footballers
Association football forwards
Quilmes Atlético Club footballers
Talleres de Remedios de Escalada footballers
Argentine Primera División players
Primera Nacional players
Primera B Metropolitana players
Footballers from Buenos Aires